Earth First!: The Journal of Ecological Resistance, is the official publication of the Earth First! movement. First published as a newsletter in 1980, it has existed alongside the movement as a way to spread commonly held beliefs in Earth First! culture, such as biocentrism, deep ecology, and direct action. The magazine is also commonly known as the Earth First! Journal and is based in Lawrence, Kansas.

References

External links
 Official website
 Media library

English-language magazines
Environmental magazines
Magazines established in 1980
Magazines published in Arizona
Magazines published in Florida
Magazines published in Kansas
Magazines published in Oregon
Newsletters